Pedicellasteridae is a family of echinoderms belonging to the order Forcipulatida.

Genera:
 Afraster Blake, Breton & Gofas, 1996
 Ampheraster Fisher, 1923
 Anteliaster Fisher, 1923
 Hydrasterias Sladen, 1889
 Pedicellaster M.Sars, 1861
 Peranaster Fisher, 1923
 Tarsaster Sladen, 1889

References

Forcipulatida
Echinoderm families